Virtuos is a global video game development company headquartered in Singapore with studios across Asia, Europe, and North America. Virtuos specializes in game development and art production for AAA consoles, PC, and mobile titles – working as an external developer for other companies.

History
Virtuos was established in Shanghai in December 2004 and opened its European office in Paris in July 2005. In June 2006, it received investment from Legend Capital. Virtuos opened its Chengdu office in January 2008 and Vancouver offices in January and November 2008, respectively. In March 2009, the company acquired BSP Audio Production Studios. In May 2009 Terminator Salvation was released in theaters. featuring 3D art made by Virtuos.

Virtuos entered Japan after signing a partnership with Kyos in December 2009. In March 2010, it reached 500 employees, and announced new-gen work-for-hire game development. In May 2010, the company ported The Price is Right to the PlayStation Network.

Virtuos produced Monster Jam: Path of Destruction for the PlayStation 3, Xbox 360, Wii, Nintendo DS and PlayStation Portable. Subsequently, it reached 800 employees and signed a work-for-hire online game development agreement with Tencent in August 2011. Virtuos acquired Sparx* Animation Studios in September 2011, increasing its employee count to over 900.

In 2012, Virtuos opened its Xi’an office in May and reached the 1,000 employees mark in October. Within the same year, Virtuos also released its first fully developed Facebook game - The Enchanted Library for GSN, as well as its first Android game, NBA 2013, for client 2K sports on the Wii, Nintendo DS and PlayStation Portable.

In July 2013, Virtuos opened an office in San Francisco. Virtuos ported XCOM: Enemy Unknown to IOS in October 2013, and won the Golden Joystick Award for "Best Mobile/Tablet Game of the Year". The company also developed Fangs Dash for China Mobile Game Entertainment in December 2013.

Virtuos also developed adaptations of Final Fantasy X and Final Fantasy X-2 for the PlayStation 3 and PlayStation Vita in April 2014. These received an 85% Metacritic score. In December 2014, Virtuos started its operations in Korea.

In July 2016, Virtuos ported Batman: Return To Arkham to the Xbox One and PlayStation 4. In February 2017, the company acquired Black Shamrock. In March 2018, it raised $15M and set up a new headquarters and R&D center in Singapore. 

Virtuos did art support on 2017's Horizon Zero Dawn and 2022's Horizon Forbidden West. In August 2020, Virtuos ported Horizon Zero Dawn to Microsoft Windows.

Virtuos Montreal was launched in September 2019. In October 2020, the company acquired CounterPunch Studios.

In May 2020, Virtuos developed the Nintendo Switch version of XCOM 2 jointly with Firaxis Games. In June 2020, Virtuos developed the Switch port for The Outer Worlds.

Virtuos secured $150M investment from Baring Private Equity Asia in September 2021. It subsequently opened a new studio in Lyon, France in December 2021. In January 2022, Virtuos acquired Volmi Games in Kyiv, Ukraine.

In April 2022, Virtuos announced its investment in Umanaïa Interactive, an up-and-coming game development studio in Quebec, Canada.

In May 2022, it was announced that Virtuos had acquired the Ho Chi Minh City-based 2D and 3D art production company, Glass Egg Digital Media. That was followed by the official launch of Virtuos Kuala Lumpur in Malaysia in August 2021, and co-development studio Calypte — a Virtuos Studio in the San Francisco Bay Area in September 2022.

In March 2023, Virtuos developed a remaster for The Outer Worlds, subtitled Spacer's Choice Edition. It has been criticized for introducing stutter to the game and being generally worse performing version than the original.

References

External links
 Interview with Virtuos CEO Gilles Langourieux
 2011 feature story on Virtuos by Gamasutra

Video game companies established in 2004
Companies based in Shanghai
Video game development companies
Video game companies of China
Video game companies of Singapore